The 7th All-Africa Games were held from September 10, 1999, to September 19, 1999, in Greater Johannesburg, South Africa. 53 countries participated in eighteen sports. Netball was included as a demonstration sport.

The South Africans hosted about 25,000 visitors including 6,000 athletes and 3,000 officials from throughout the continent. The Opening Ceremonies, with dancing, African parables and Zulu warriors, was staged in an arena with less than 15 000 spectators.

South Africa, which had lost to Greece for a bid for the 2004 Olympic Games was hoping to impress FIFA in hopes of landing the 2006 World Cup. It eventually got the 2010 edition. Overall the games were a success, with hosts South Africa outdistancing Nigeria and Egypt in the medals race.

Typical problems at the games included 600 children contracting food poisoning after being fed boxed lunches at the practice session for the Opening Ceremonies, striking laborers demonstrating outside games venues, displaying placards which read "No Wages, No All Africa Games." Women's field hockey was demoted to a non-medal event after the Nigerian team dropped out of the tournament. A melee at the finish of the basketball game between Angola and Egypt forced police to escort the Egyptian team from the court. Haile Gebrselassie, the world record holder in the 5,000 and 10,000 meter runs opted out of the games for health reasons, depriving the games organizers of one of the biggest drawing cards of the games.

Despite the difficulties experienced, IOC President Juan Antonio Samaranch, praised South Africa's organization of the Games, saying "this shows that you can organize big events."

Olympic stars Maria de Lurdes Mutola (athletics-800 m), Penny Heyns (swimming), Gete Wami (athletics, 10000 m) all starred in the women's events. South African pole vaulter Okkert Brits won his second African Games gold medal. Assefa Mezgebu of Ethiopia won the men's 10000 m.

Cameroon beat Zambia 4-3 on penalty kicks to win the football finale.

Participating sports

demonstration sport:

Venues

Ellis Park Stadium
Ellis Park Aquatic Centre
Ellis Park Tennis Centre
Expo Auditorium
Expo Centre Hall 
Expo Centre Rand Show Road
Johannesburg Stadium
Wits University Old Mutual Sports Hall
Orlando Stadium
Pimville Indoor Hall
Rand Stadium
Randburg Astro Stadium
Randburg Indoor Sports Hall
Randburg Precinct
Vista University
Wembly Indoor Hall

Medal table

Athletics

See  Athletics at the 1999 All-Africa Games

Maria de Lurdes Mutola of Mozambique won her third 800 metres title in a row. Nigeria won all four relay races; 4x100 metres and 4x400 metres for men and women. South African athletes won all four throwing events for men.

Some new women's events were added: pole vault, hammer throw and 10 kilometres road walk.

Field hockey 

Men: 1. South Africa, 2. Egypt, 3. Kenya, 4. Zimbabwe, 5. Ghana, 6. Malawi
Women. 1. South Africa, 2. Zimbabwe, 3. Kenya, 4. Namibia

Soccer

The soccer tournament was won by Cameroon, who became the second team to win this tournament twice.

References

External links
Official site
Athletics results - gbrathletics.com
https://web.archive.org/web/20100120090652/http://www.sportscheduler.co.sz/all_africa_games99.htm

 
A
African Games
A
1990s in Johannesburg
Sports competitions in Johannesburg
All-Africa Games
All-Africa Games
Multi-sport events in South Africa
September 1999 sports events in Africa